Jason Eyenga Lokilo (born 17 September 1998) is a Congolese professional footballer who plays as a winger for Turkish club İstanbulspor on loan from the Dutch club Sparta Rotterdam.

Early life
Lokilo was born in Brussels, Belgium on 17 September 1998.

Club career
Lokilo was a member of the Anderlecht academy between 2007 and 2014. He signed for Crystal Palace in July 2015, spending the following two seasons playing for their youth teams.
Following a number of appearances for the first team in pre-season games, Lokilo made his senior debut for Crystal Palace on 22 August 2017 against Ipswich Town in the EFL Cup.

In August 2018, he joined French club FC Lorient on a season-long loan.

Doncaster Rovers

In January 2020, he joined League One club Doncaster Rovers on loan until the end of the 2019–20 season, at which time he was released by Crystal Palace. On 2 August 2020, he re-joined Doncaster Rovers on a one-year deal. In June 2021 he left Doncaster Rovers after failing to agree a new deal.

Górnik Łęczna

On 9 September 2021, he signed a two-year contract with Polish club Górnik Łęczna.

Sparta Rotterdam
On 24 June 2022, Lokilo moved to Sparta Rotterdam in the Netherlands with a contract for two seasons, with an option for a third season. On 20 January 2023, he was loaned to İstanbulspor in Turkey until the end of the 2022–23 season.

International career
Lokilo was born in Belgium and is of Congolese descent. Lokilo debuted for the DR Congo U20 in an 8–0 friendly loss to the England U17s on 7 October 2015.

Career statistics

References

External links
 Profile at Crystal Palace F.C. website
 
 

1998 births
Living people
Footballers from Brussels
Belgian footballers
Citizens of the Democratic Republic of the Congo through descent
Democratic Republic of the Congo footballers
Democratic Republic of the Congo under-20 international footballers
Association football wingers
Crystal Palace F.C. players
FC Lorient players
Doncaster Rovers F.C. players
Górnik Łęczna players
Sparta Rotterdam players
İstanbulspor footballers
Ekstraklasa players
Eredivisie players
Süper Lig players
Belgian expatriate footballers
Democratic Republic of the Congo expatriate footballers
Expatriate footballers in England
Expatriate footballers in France
Expatriate footballers in Poland
Expatriate footballers in the Netherlands
Expatriate footballers in Turkey
Belgian expatriate sportspeople in England
Belgian expatriate sportspeople in France
Belgian expatriate sportspeople in Poland
Belgian expatriate sportspeople in the Netherlands
Belgian expatriate sportspeople in Turkey
Democratic Republic of the Congo expatriate sportspeople in England
Democratic Republic of the Congo expatriate sportspeople in France
Democratic Republic of the Congo expatriate sportspeople in Poland
Democratic Republic of the Congo expatriate sportspeople in the Netherlands
Democratic Republic of the Congo expatriate sportspeople in Turkey
Belgian people of Democratic Republic of the Congo descent